The Flat is an anchorage just north of North Island in the Houtman Abrolhos.

References

North Island (Houtman Abrolhos)